Jang Yeon-hak (born 14 February 1997) is a South Korean weightlifter. He won the silver medal in the men's 85 kg event at the 2018 Asian Games held in Jakarta, Indonesia.

In 2017, he won the bronze medal in the men's 85 kg event at the 2017 Summer Universiade held in Taipei, Taiwan.

References

External links 
 

Living people
1997 births
Place of birth missing (living people)
South Korean male weightlifters
Weightlifters at the 2018 Asian Games
Medalists at the 2018 Asian Games
Asian Games silver medalists for South Korea
Asian Games medalists in weightlifting
Universiade medalists in weightlifting
Universiade bronze medalists for South Korea
Medalists at the 2017 Summer Universiade
21st-century South Korean people